Eric & Us is a 1974 memoir by Jacintha Buddicom recalling her childhood friendship with Eric Blair, the real name of author George Orwell. Buddicom first met Blair when he was eleven and he became very close to her family. Their friendship lasted until Blair became a policeman in Burma and the two lost touch. Blair and Buddicom never saw one another again and did not resume contact until 1949, shortly before Orwell's death from tuberculosis.

Buddicom's memoir, as well as recalling her relationship with Orwell, shows her disappointment in some of the views he took — for instance, she condemned his decision to fight in the Spanish Civil War as interfering in the affairs of another country. She also portrayed him as reserved but happy, in contrast to the bleak picture Orwell presents of his childhood in "Such, Such Were the Joys".

Buddicom's cousin, Dione Venables, added a postscript to the memoir in 2006, suggesting that the real reason for the ending of Blair and Buddicom's friendship was the possibility that Blair, in an attempt to further their relationship, may have tried to rape Buddicom. Venables recalled that there was incident in 1921 in which Buddicom shouted, screamed and kicked before running home after Blair made advances on her, this interaction left her with a torn skirt and a bruised hip. Dione Venables responded by stating that Buddicom never interpreted Blair's adolescent fumbling as rape, but that the incident was merely a moment when his immature desires got the better of him.

References 

1974 non-fiction books
Books about George Orwell
Literary memoirs
British memoirs